The following is a list of the 17 cantons of the Pyrénées-Orientales department, in France, following the French canton reorganisation which came into effect in March 2015:

 Les Aspres
 Le Canigou
 La Côte Sableuse
 La Côte Salanquaise
 La Côte Vermeille
 Perpignan-1
 Perpignan-2
 Perpignan-3
 Perpignan-4
 Perpignan-5
 Perpignan-6
 La Plaine d'Illibéris
 Les Pyrénées catalanes
 Le Ribéral
 La Vallée de l'Agly
 La Vallée de la Têt
 Vallespir-Albères

References

 
Geography of Pyrénées-Orientales